Ayrat Farrakhov (born February 17, 1968, Agryz, Tatar Autonomous Soviet Socialist Republic) is a Russian politician and a deputy of the 8th State Duma.

In 2015 he was awarded a Doctor of Sciences in Medicine. From 1993 to 1995, he was the ward surgeon at the Kazan State Medical University department of surgery. From 1995 to 2006, he worked at the Republican Clinical Hospital of the Ministry of Health of the Republic of Tatarstan. In 2006 he was appointed the head of the Health Department of the executive committee of the сity of Kazan. From October 2007 to September 2013, he was the Minister of Health of the Republic of Tatarstan. He left the post to become the Deputy Minister of Health of the Russian Federation. In 2014 he was appointed the Deputy Minister of Finance.

On September 18, 2016, he was elected deputy of the 7th State Duma from the Tatarstan constituency. Since September 2021, he has served as a deputy of the 8th State Duma.

He is one of the members of the State Duma the United States Treasury sanctioned on 24 March 2022 in response to the 2022 Russian invasion of Ukraine.

References

1968 births
Living people
United Russia politicians
21st-century Russian politicians
Eighth convocation members of the State Duma (Russian Federation)
Russian individuals subject to the U.S. Department of the Treasury sanctions